Kenora—Rainy River is a provincial electoral district (riding) in northwestern Ontario, Canada, that has been represented in the Legislative Assembly of Ontario since 1999. It was created from Kenora, most of Rainy River and part of Lake Nipigon. The boundaries of the new district corresponded with the Kenora—Rainy River federal riding, until it was abolished in 2003. The provincial riding will continue to exist.

Greg Rickford of the Progressive Conservatives was elected its MPP in 2018.  The riding was previously represented by Sarah Campbell for the NDP and Howard Hampton, former leader of the Ontario New Democratic Party. The riding includes the western three quarters of Kenora District, the western three quarters of the Rainy River District and the northwest corner of the Thunder Bay District.

History

In 1996, Ontario was divided into the same electoral districts as those used for federal electoral purposes. They were redistributed whenever a readjustment took place at the federal level.

In 2005, legislation was passed by the Legislature to divide Ontario into 107 electoral districts, beginning with the next provincial election in 2007. The eleven northern electoral districts, including Kenora—Rainy River, are those defined for federal purposes in 1996, based on the 1991 census (except for a minor boundary adjustment). The 96 southern electoral districts are those defined for federal electoral purposes in 2003, based on the 2001 census. Without this legislation, the number of electoral districts in northern Ontario would have been reduced from eleven to ten.

Prior to the 2018 provincial election, the Ontario government's Far North Electoral Boundaries Commission proposed dividing Kenora—Rainy River into one riding for the urbanized southern portion of the current district, which will retain the name Kenora—Rainy River, and one riding for the predominantly Indigenous northern portion of the current district, to be named Kiiwetinoong. The creation of Kiiwetinoong and Mushkegowuk—James Bay, another new northern riding, were approved with the passage of the Representation Statute Law Amendment Act, 2017 in the Legislative Assembly of Ontario.

Members

Election results

		

		

	

|align="left" colspan=2|New Democrat hold
|align="right"|Swing
|align="right"| +1.09

^ Change is from redistributed results

2007 electoral reform referendum

Notes

Sources
 Elections Ontario
1999 results
2003 results
2007 results
Map of riding for 2018 election

Ontario provincial electoral districts
Fort Frances
Dryden, Ontario
Politics of Kenora
Rainy River District